Tere Mere Sapne (English: Our Dreams) is a 1971 film produced by Dev Anand, and written and directed by his brother Vijay Anand for Navketan Films. The movie stars Dev Anand, Mumtaz, Hema Malini and Vijay Anand in key roles. The film's music is by S. D. Burman and the story is based on The Citadel, a novel by A.J. Cronin.  In 1972, it was made as Bengali film Jiban Saikate, with Soumitra Chatterjee and Aparna Sen and in 1982, it was remade into the Telugu film Madhura Swapnam.

Cast
Dev Anand as  Dr. Anand Kumar 
Mumtaz as  Nisha Patel / Nisha Kumar
Hema Malini as  Maltimala (Sp. App.)
Mahesh Kaul as  Dr. Prasad 
Vijay Anand as  Dr. Jagannath Kothari 
Tabassum as Maltimala's Hairdresser
 Agha as Dr. Bhutani
 Paro as Mrs. Prasad
 Leela Mishra as Nisha's aunt
 Sapru as Phoolchand
 Jayshree T. as Dancer in song "Mera Saajan Phool Kamal Ka"
 Mumtaz Begum as Maltimala's Mother
 Prem Nath as Seth. Madhochand
 Dulari as Phoolchand's Wife

Soundtrack
The Soundtrack of the movie is by Sachin Dev Burman and the lyrics were penned by Gopaldas Neeraj.

Reception
In 1971, a dispute occurred at one cinema in Dadar, when a Marathi movie was replaced with Tere Mere Sapne.

Unlike Anand's previous "Golden" hits, Tere Mere Sapne did not do as well at the box office.

Among retrospective reviews, Farhana Farook writing for Filmfare called it one of Mumtaz's best performances. Hindustan Times included it in it in their list of Anand's top 10 films. Kamal Haasan who included it in his list of 70 favourite movies since 1947 stated "The film stayed with me. This was romance in the early Seventies, but the kind of characters you saw in this film were rare at the time -- like the alcoholic doctor. At that time, one was aching for films that would come close to Erich Segal’s Love Story. And Tere Mere Sapne was different, despite being a typical Hindi film. I was not interested in Aradhana (1969). Later there were other different films like Rajnigandha (1974) but they didn’t change my perception. For me, Tere Mere Sapne became a primer to see better cinema. We graduated to better cinema because of such films. Otherwise, films by directors like Satyajit Ray would have remained boxes to tick off on a to-do list."

References

External links
 

Films scored by S. D. Burman
1971 films
1970s Hindi-language films
Films set in India
Films based on works by A. J. Cronin
Films directed by Vijay Anand
Hindi films remade in other languages
Indian pregnancy films
1970s pregnancy films